Laurie Ann Lewis (born December 20, 1949) is an American former volleyball player. She played for the United States national team at the 1968 Summer Olympics. She also played for UCLA and helped the team win the 1971–72 national championship.

References

1949 births
Living people
Olympic volleyball players of the United States
Volleyball players at the 1968 Summer Olympics
Volleyball players at the 1967 Pan American Games
Pan American Games gold medalists for the United States
UCLA Bruins women's volleyball players
Sportspeople from Palo Alto, California
American women's volleyball players
Pan American Games medalists in volleyball
Medalists at the 1967 Pan American Games